The FAMILY Act is a proposed United States law that would provide paid family and medical leave benefits to certain individuals who meet requirements specified in the bill.

Background

Provisions

Legislative history 
As of November 7, 2022 :

See also 
 List of bills in the 115th United States Congress
 List of bills in the 116th United States Congress
 List of bills in the 117th United States Congress

References

External links 

Proposed legislation of the 115th United States Congress
Proposed legislation of the 116th United States Congress
Proposed legislation of the 117th United States Congress